Kumud Mishra is an Indian  actor in Hindi cinema. He mainly plays supporting roles in movies, television series, and web series but has also played lead roles in some of them.

Career
He played Eknath, a trade union leader in the 1995 Doordarshan drama Swabhimaan. In 2011, he progressed to film acting with Rishi Kapoor and Ranbir Kapoor's films Patiala House and Rockstar.

Mishra has played supporting roles in the films Filmistaan, Revolver Rani, Jolly LLB 2, Raanjhanaa, Badlapur, Bangistan, Airlift, M. S. Dhoni: The Untold Story, Sultan, Tiger Zinda Hai, Rukh, Aiyaary, Mulk, De De Pyaar De, Article 15, Bharat, Jawaani Jaaneman, Thappad, Sooryavanshi and Tadap. In 2020, he starred in the titular role in Sony LIV original Ram Singh Charlie that follows the life of a circus artist and his subsequent struggle after the circus is shut.
Mishra is an alumnus of Rashtriya Military School Belgaum, Karnataka and graduated from National School Of Drama, Delhi

Personal life
Mishra is married to actress Ayesha Raza and they have a son, Kabir.

Filmography

Films 
'" Kuttey 2022 | "" SARDAR ""

Web series

Short films

Accolades

References

External links
 

Indian male stage actors
Indian male film actors
Living people
20th-century Indian male actors
Place of birth missing (living people)
Year of birth missing (living people)
National School of Drama alumni